Vadim Viktorovich Filippov (born 8 March 1983) is a former Russian professional football player.

Club career
He played in the Russian Football National League for FC Metallurg Krasnoyarsk in 2002.

External links
 

1983 births
Living people
Russian footballers
Association football defenders
FC Yenisey Krasnoyarsk players
FC Zvezda Irkutsk players
FC Amur Blagoveshchensk players